Tanel Kiik (born 23 January 1989) is an Estonian politician and former cabinet minister. 

He served as Minister of Social Affairs in the second cabinet of Jüri Ratas.

In the cabinet of Kaja Kallas, his office was split into Minister of Health and Labour and Minister of Social Protection. Kiik was appointed as Minister of Health and Labour and Signe Riisalo was appointed as Minister of Social Protection.

References 

Living people
1989 births
Politicians from Tallinn
Government ministers of Estonia
21st-century Estonian politicians
Estonian Centre Party politicians
University of Tartu alumni